Ali Faez Atiyah ( or  ; born 9 September 1994) is an Iraqi football defender and an Olympian  who plays for Al-Talaba and the Iraq national team. He has established himself as a 'dead ball' specialist or setpiece taker.

Club career
The former graduate of the Ammo Baba Football School was born in 1994 and first made his league debut for Al-Sinaa and then Al-Karkh where he became a regular in one of the Iraqi league's youngest team before he moved north to four-time Iraqi league winners Erbil SC halfway through the 2012–2013 season for a -year deal worth 40m Iraqi dinars. before he joined Al Shorta.

Ali has played at every age group level for the Iraqi national team from U-14s to the senior team and by the age of just 21 had already represented Iraq at the Asian Cup, the WAFF Championship and the Gulf Cup.

In July 2016 Ali signed for Turkish Team Çaykur Rizespor. However, after a season which saw limited playing time and a relegation from the Süper Lig, Ali made his debut on August 20, 2016, as a center back playing the full 90 minutes against Konyaspor. Ali requested to leave the club, which was granted by a loan to former club Al Shorta.

In June 2018, he signed a one-year contract with Al Kharaitiyat SC.

Ali supported Al-Zawraa while he was growing up and cites Spanish midfielder Xabi Alonso as his favourite player and is a Real Madrid fan.  The defender, a dead-ball specialist, taking both free-kicks and penalties, can be deployed in the centre of defence, at right back and as a defensive midfielder.

International career
Ali is one of a select few to have played at every level for Iraq from Ishbal (Cubs) to the senior side after making his international debut last year in the 6–0 defeat to Chile in Copenhagen. On 14 August 2013, Ali played his first international match for Iraq against Chile in a friendly match. When he was handed his international debut by Serbian Vladimir Petrović in 2013 at the age of 18 years, 11 months and 5 days, he became one of the youngest players to represent Iraq. However, he was given a baptism of fire in his first game when he came up against Chilean stars Alexis Sánchez and Arturo Vidal  – a game which ended in a 6–0 defeat at the Brøndby Stadion in Copenhagen.  Ali scored his first goal for the senior side against Qatar in the Arabian Gulf Cup with a sublime free-kick., he scored a penalty on the following match to score in two back-to-back games.

International goals
Scores and results list Iraq's goal tally first.

Honours

Club 

Al-Karkh
Iraq Division One: 2012–13

Al-Shorta
Iraqi Super Cup: 2019

International
Iraq
AFC Asian Cup fourth-place: 2015
Arabian Gulf Cup: 2023

Iraq U-23
AFC U-22 Championship: 2013

Iraq U-20
AFC U-19 Championship runner-up: 2012
FIFA U-20 World Cup 4th-place : 2013

References

External links
 Player profile on Goalzz.com
 

1994 births
Living people
Sportspeople from Baghdad
Iraqi footballers
Association football defenders
Al-Karkh SC players
Erbil SC players
Al-Shorta SC players
Çaykur Rizespor footballers
Al Kharaitiyat SC players
Iraqi Premier League players
Süper Lig players
Qatar Stars League players
Olympic footballers of Iraq
Iraq international footballers
2015 AFC Asian Cup players
Footballers at the 2016 Summer Olympics
2019 AFC Asian Cup players
Iraqi expatriate footballers
Iraqi expatriate sportspeople in Turkey
Iraqi expatriate sportspeople in Qatar
Expatriate footballers in Turkey
Expatriate footballers in Qatar
Expatriate footballers in Kuwait
Qadsia SC players
Kuwait Premier League players
Iraqi expatriate sportspeople in Kuwait